Ray Keller is an American politician from the state of Texas. He served in the Texas House of Representatives from 1979 through 1987. He is a candidate for Texas Railroad Commissioner in the 2014 elections.

Keller is from North Richland Hills, Texas.

References

Living people
Republican Party members of the Texas House of Representatives
People from North Richland Hills, Texas
Year of birth missing (living people)